Sinclair Hill (10 June 1896 – 6 March 1945) was a British film director, producer and screenwriter. He directed nearly fifty films between 1920 and 1939. He was born as George Sinclair-Hill in London in 1894. He was awarded an OBE for his services to film.

Hill was employed by Stoll Pictures in the 1920s and Gainsborough Pictures in the 1930s.

Filmography

 At the Villa Rose (1920)
 The Hundredth Chance (1920)
 The Tidal Wave (1920)
 The Tavern Knight (1920)
 A Question of Trust (1920)
 The Place of Honour (1921)
 The Mystery of Mr. Bernard Brown (1921)
 The Nonentity (1921)
 The Lonely Lady of Grosvenor Square (1922)
 The Experiment (1922)
 Half a Truth (1922)
 Petticoat Loose (1922)
 The Truants (1922)
 Open Country (1922)
 Expiation (1922)
 The Indian Love Lyrics (1923)
 Don Quixote (1923)
 One Arabian Night (1923)
 The Conspirators (1924)
 White Slippers (1924)
 The Prehistoric Man (1924)
 The Secret Kingdom (1925)
 The Presumption of Stanley Hay, MP (1925)
 The Squire of Long Hadley (1925)
 The Qualified Adventurer (1926)
 Sahara Love (1926)
 The Chinese Bungalow (1926)
 The King's Highway (1927)
 A Woman Redeemed (1927)
 The Price of Divorce (1928)
 Boadicea (1928)
 The Guns of Loos (1928)
 The Unwritten Law (1929)
 Greek Street (1930)
 Dark Red Roses (1930)
 Such Is the Law (1930)
 The Great Gay Road (1931)
 Other People's Sins (1931)
 A Gentleman of Paris (1931)
 The First Mrs. Fraser (1932)
 The Man from Toronto (1933)
 Britannia of Billingsgate (1933)
 My Old Dutch (1934)
 Hyde Park Corner (1935)
 The Cardinal (1936)
 The Gay Adventure (1936)
 Take a Chance (1937)
 Command Performance (1937)
 Midnight Menace (1937)
 Follow Your Star (1938)

References

External links

British film directors
1890s births
1945 deaths
British male screenwriters
British film producers
People from Surbiton
20th-century British screenwriters
Royal Air Force personnel killed in World War II
Victims of aviation accidents or incidents in 1945
Royal Air Force wing commanders